The Ștefan cel Mare University of Suceava (USV), also known as University of Suceava, is a public university in Suceava, Suceava County, Bukovina, northeastern Romania, officially founded in 1990 and initially established in 1963 as the Institute of Pedagogy. It was named in honour of the Moldavian Prince Stephen the Great. The university is situated on Strada Universității nr. 13 (University Street number 13) in the Areni neighbourhood in the town centre, also in the proximity of the town hall.

History 

The first higher education school in Suceava was founded in 1963 as the Institute of Pedagogy. The institution had three faculties: Letters, Mathematics and Physics, and History and Geography. In 1984, it was transformed into the Sub-Engineering Institute, subordinated to the Technical University of Iași.

In 1990, after officially given the university title by the Romanian government, the institution started to individualize throughout academic consolidation, didactic and scientific diversification, not least by getting better known nationally and internationally. In September 2008, the university was awarded with a High Confidence Rating by the executive bureau of ARACIS (Romanian Agency for Quality Assurance in Higher Education). In 2009, the Ștefan cel Mare University was ranked fourth on a list created by the Kienbaum Management Consultants firm in cooperation with Capital financial magazine about the images universities have among employers.

Timeline 

 1963–1975: Higher educational phase - Institute of Pedagogy;
 1976–1984: Joint Institute for Higher Education, Pedagogical and Technical;
 1984–1989: Institute of Associate Engineering (part of the Gheorghe Asachi Polytechnic Institute of Iași);
 1985: Power Engineering was introduced to train engineers (6 years of studies and evening courses only);
 1986: Evening courses in Automation and Computers were held for the first time (six years of studies).
 Post–1990: "Ștefan cel Mare" University of Suceava
 1990: Day courses on a five-year basis were first introduced for both specializations; Automation and Electromechanics specializations were established, Engineer degree, day courses (five years) and evening courses (six years); the Electrotechnics Chair was established, which represented the forerunner of the Faculty of Electrical Engineering.
 1991: The Faculty of Electrical Engineering was established; the Computers and Automation Chair was established; the Engineer Diploma was awarded to the first generation of graduates in Power Engineering.

Faculties 

Nowadays, the Ștefan cel Mare University (USV) has the following ten faculties:

 Faculty of Economics and Public Administration;
 Faculty of Educational Sciences;
 Faculty of Electrical Engineering and Computer Science;
 Faculty of Food Engineering;
 Faculty of Forestry;
 Faculty of History and Geography;
 Faculty of Law and Administrative Sciences;
 Faculty of Letters and Communication Sciences;
 Faculty of Mechanical Engineering, Mechatronics and Management;
 Faculty of Physical Education and Sports.

Facilities 

USV disposes of a noteworthy series of facilities including a student radio station (i.e. Radio USV), a student TV channel owned by Digital Media Center (DMC) with headquarters at the students' house, a large football pitch, a swimming basin, and numerous scientific laboratories equipped with the latest technology in the fields of robotics, mechanics, virtual reality (VR), and many more. Radio USV has been active since the early 2010s (more specifically from 2011 onwards) whereas Digital Media Center's student TV channel has been operating since 2018 to the present day.

International relations 

During the academic year 2018–19, USV reported international agreements with universities in Algeria, Armenia, Azerbaijan, Bulgaria, Cameroon, China, Ivory Coast, Croatia, Czech Republic, Ecuador, France, Germany, Georgia, Hungary, Greece, Jordan, Indonesia, Israel, Italy, Japan, Kazakhstan, Kyrgyzstan, Morocco, Moldova, Poland, Portugal, Russia, Senegal, Slovakia, South Korea, Spain, Sweden, Switzerland, Togo, Turkey, Ukraine, and United Kingdom. It is also a partner of the EUROSCI Network.

Gallery

References

External links 

 Official website

Educational institutions established in 1990
Universities in Romania
Education in Suceava
1990 establishments in Romania
Buildings and structures in Suceava